Pindadaan is an Indian Marathi language film directed by Prashant Patil. The film stars Siddharth Chandekar, Manava Naik and Paula McGlynn. Music by Sagar Dhote. The film was released on 17 June 2016.

Synopsis 
When Ashutosh, a London-based director, documents the death rituals in Maharashtra, he falls for Anna, a Briton. Rudrababa, a priest, is surprised to see him and reveals a shocking truth about him.

Cast 
 Siddharth Chandekar as Ashutosh 
 Manava Naik as Ruhi
 Paula McGlynn as British Girl Anna
 Sanjay Kulkarni as Tukaram

Soundtrack

Critical response 
Pindadaan film received negative reviews from critics. Ganesh Matkari of Pune Mirror wrote "It is painful to see good resources wasted on obviously flawed projects when there is a dearth of funding for meaningful cinema". Soumitra Pote of Maharashtra Times gave the film 2 stars out of 5 and wrote "We were entertained while watching all this. But when we think about things, we get disappointed. Despite the good financial support, expensive costumes, glamorous actors, this 'daan' seems like a hobby only because the 'Daan' required for the film has not been completed". Reshma Raikwar of Loksatta wrote "The last few minutes reveal many things from the first frame of the film. Then we have to be satisfied that what we saw had some meaning".

References

External links
 

2016 films
2010s Marathi-language films
Indian drama films